In geometric topology, the spherical space form conjecture (now a theorem) states that a finite group acting on the 3-sphere is conjugate to a group of isometries of the 3-sphere.

History
The conjecture was posed by Heinz Hopf in 1926 after determining the fundamental groups of three-dimensional spherical space forms as a generalization of the Poincaré conjecture to the non-simply connected case.

Status
The conjecture is implied by Thurston's geometrization conjecture, which was proven by Grigori Perelman in 2003. The conjecture was independently proven for groups whose actions have fixed points—this special case is known as the Smith conjecture. It is also proven for various groups acting without fixed points, such as cyclic groups whose orders are a power of two (George Livesay, Robert Myers) and cyclic groups of order 3 (J. Hyam Rubinstein).

See also
Killing–Hopf theorem

References

Conjectures that have been proved
Geometric topology